Isabel Elaine Allen is an American survey statistician and biostatistician who has published highly-cited work on topics including distance education, the theory of Likert scales, antibacterial treatments, and meta-analysis of medical trials. She is a professor of biostatistics and epidemiology at the University of California, San Francisco, and a professor emeritus of statistics at Babson College.

Education and career
Allen majored in psychology at Skidmore College, graduating in 1970. She earned a master's degree in mathematics at the University of Evansville in 1975, and completed her Ph.D. in statistics at Cornell University in 1979.

She took a faculty position at the Wharton School of the University of Pennsylvania even before completing her doctorate, and also held faculty positions at the Medical College of Pennsylvania and Rutgers University prior to her position at Babson College. She also taught at University of California, San Francisco.

As well as her academic work, Allen has helped to found several companies, including the Quahog Research Group, ARIAD Pharmaceuticals,  Pondview Associates, StatSystems, and Bay View Analytics.

Recognition
Allen was named a Fellow of the American Statistical Association in 2004. She was the main statistical expert for an investigative journalism project concerning fair housing, "Long Island Divided", which won the 2020 Edward R. Murrow Award of the Radio Television Digital News Association for a news documentary by a large digital news organization.

Skidmore College gave her their Creative Thought Matters Award of Distinction award in 2015.

References

External links

Year of birth missing (living people)
Living people
American women statisticians
Skidmore College alumni
University of Evansville alumni
Cornell University alumni
Wharton School of the University of Pennsylvania faculty
Drexel University faculty
Rutgers University faculty
Babson College faculty
University of California, San Francisco faculty
Fellows of the American Statistical Association
21st-century American women